Earth's Last Citadel is a science fiction novel written by the American husband and wife team of C.L. Moore and Henry Kuttner. It was first published in 1943 in the magazine Argosy and in book form it was published first in 1964.

Plot
During World War II, four people (two belonging to the Allies, two to the Axis) find a strange vehicle in the Tunisian desert.  It whisks them to the far future where the Earth has been conquered and mankind is nearly extinct.

References

Sources
 Clute, John and John Grant. The Encyclopedia of Fantasy. London: Orbit Books, 1997. .

External links
 

1943 American novels
1943 science fiction novels
American science fiction novels
Novels about time travel
Post-apocalyptic novels
Works originally published in Argosy (magazine)
Ace Books books
Novels first published in serial form